The Egg Harbor City School District is a comprehensive community public school district responsible for the education of children in pre-kindergarten through eighth grade from Egg Harbor City, in Atlantic County, New Jersey, United States.

As of the 2021–22 school year, the district, comprised of two schools, had an enrollment of 529 students and 55.0 classroom teachers (on an FTE basis), for a student–teacher ratio of 9.6:1.

The district is classified by the New Jersey Department of Education as being in District Factor Group "A", the lowest of eight groupings. District Factor Groups organize districts statewide to allow comparison by common socioeconomic characteristics of the local districts. From lowest socioeconomic status to highest, the categories are A, B, CD, DE, FG, GH, I and J.

Students in ninth through twelfth grades attend Cedar Creek High School, which is located in the northern section of Egg Harbor City and opened to students in September 2010. As of the 2021–22 school year, the high school had an enrollment of 962 students and 77.8 classroom teachers (on an FTE basis), for a student–teacher ratio of 12.4:1. The school is one of three high schools operated as part of the Greater Egg Harbor Regional High School District, which also includes the constituent municipalities of Egg Harbor City, Galloway Township, Hamilton Township and Mullica Township, and participates in sending/receiving relationships with Port Republic and Washington Township (Burlington County). Cedar Creek High School is zoned to serve students from Egg Harbor City, Mullica Township, Port Republic and Washington Township, while students in portions of Galloway and Hamilton townships have the opportunity to attend Cedar Creek through the school of choice program or through attendance in magnet programs offered at Cedar Creek.

Schools
Schools in the district (with 2021–22 enrollment data from the National Center for Education Statistics) are:
Elementary school
Charles L. Spragg School with 244 students in PreK to Grade 3
Adrienne Shulby, Principal
Middle school
Egg Harbor City Community School with 276 students in grades 4 to 8
Gina Forester, Principal

 Former schools
 In 1948, during de jure educational segregation in the United States, the district had a school for black children.

Administration
Core members of the district's administration are:
Adrienne Shulby, Superintendent of Schools
Allyson Milazzo, Business Administrator / Board Secretary

Board of education
The district's board of education, comprised of seven members, sets policy and oversees the fiscal and educational operation of the district through its administration. As a Type II school district, the board's trustees are elected directly by voters to serve three-year terms of office on a staggered basis, with either two or three seats up for election each year held (since 2012) as part of the November general election. The board appoints a superintendent to oversee the district's day-to-day operations and a business administrator to supervise the business functions of the district.

References

External links
Egg Harbor City School District

School Data for the Egg Harbor City School District, National Center for Education Statistics
Greater Egg Harbor Regional High School District
Absegami High School website

Egg Harbor City, New Jersey
New Jersey District Factor Group A
School districts in Atlantic County, New Jersey